Didier Xhaet (born 9 September 1955) is a Belgian alpine skier. He competed in three events at the 1976 Winter Olympics.

References

1955 births
Living people
Belgian male alpine skiers
Olympic alpine skiers of Belgium
Alpine skiers at the 1976 Winter Olympics
Place of birth missing (living people)